Carolyn Anne Burton (born 30 March 1955) is an Australian politician. Born in Perth, Western Australia, she was a finance officer before entering politics. On 12 September 2008, she was elected to the Western Australian Legislative Council in a countback after the resignation of Graham Giffard; like Giffard, she is a member of the Labor Party. Her term expired on 21 May 2009.

References

1955 births
Living people
Members of the Western Australian Legislative Council
Australian Labor Party members of the Parliament of Western Australia
Politicians from Perth, Western Australia
21st-century Australian politicians
Women members of the Western Australian Legislative Council
21st-century Australian women politicians